Phra Phutthaloetla Naphalai (24 February 1767 or 1768 – 21 July 1824), personal name Chim, also styled as Rama II, was the second monarch of Siam under the Chakri dynasty, ruling from 1809 to 1824. In 1809, Itsarasunthon succeeded his father Rama I, the founder of Chakri dynasty, as Loetlanaphalai the King of Siam. His reign was largely peaceful, devoid of major conflicts. His reign was known as the "Golden Age of Rattanakosin Literature" as Loetlanaphalai was patron to a number of poets in his court and the King himself was a renowned poet and artist. The most notable poet in his employ was the illustrious Sunthorn Phu, the author of Phra Aphai Mani.

Early life

Chim was born in 1767 during the Ayutthaya Kingdom in Amphawa District, Samut Songkram. Chim was a son of Luang Yokkrabat of Ratchaburi and Nak of Samut Sakorn, as his father and mother was then known. They would later become King Rama I and Queen Amarindra, respectively.

In 1767, Ayutthaya fell to Konbaung Burmese invaders. His father, Phraya Ratchaburi, joined Taksin's forces to recapture the city. Under King Taksin, Chim's father rose rapidly to high rank as a military leader and was assigned with the campaigns to subjugate Laos and Cambodia. In 1782, his father crowned himself King of Siam (later named Rama I) and Chim himself was raised to the title of Prince Itsarasunthon of Siam.

Loetlanaphalai, with his concubine Sri Sulalai, fathered Prince Tub ( – later Rama III) in 1787. Prince Itsarasunthon then had a secret affair with his own cousin, Princess Bunrod. In 1801, Rama I then found out that Princess Bunrod had been pregnant for four months and banished her out of the palace to live with her brother. Itsarasunthon, however begged his father to forgive him and the princess was reinstated and became his consort through the negotiation by concubine Khamwaen. Unfortunately, the baby died just after its birth.

With Princess Bunrod, Loetlanaphalai also fathered Mongkut (1804) and Pinklao (1808). Prince Itsarasunthon was appointed to the Front Palace as Lord of the Front Palace or Uparaja in 1807 to succeed his uncle Maha Sura Singhanat who had died in 1803, though he continued to stay at the Thonburi Palace. Among his many other children was Prince Wongsa Dhiraj Snid, who was a royal physician for many years as well as a field commander and diplomat.

Ascension
As the eldest surviving legitimate son of Rama I, Prince Itsarasunthon succeeded to throne when Buddha Yotfa Chulaloke died in 1809. No royal naming system was established at the time Rama II was crowned. He was later named by his son Nangklao as Loetlasulalai but changed to Loetlanaphalai by his another son Mongkut and by the Rama convention, called Rama II. His consort, Princess Bunrod, was raised to Queen Sri Suriyendra.

As soon as Loetlanaphalai ascended the throne, Prince Kshatranichit, the surviving son of Taksin, rebelled as pretender to the throne. Loetlanaphalai's son, Prince Tub  effectively crushed the rebellion, proving himself to be competent, thus gaining his father's favor. Prince Tub was raised to Kromma Muen, given the Sanskrit-derived name Jessadabodindra, and made Minister of Foreign Affairs.

Countering the last major Burmese invasions

The Konbaung king Bodawpaya, seeing that Rama I was dead, marched an army into Chumphon and conquered Thalang (Phuket City) in the same year. Loetlanaphalai sent his brother Maha Senanurak the Front Palace to recapture Thalang, which had been razed to the ground. This "Thalang campaign" was the last invasion by the Burmese into Thai territory.

In 1820, fearing an imminent attack by the Burmese on Siam, Rama II ordered his staff to collect all information in regards to potential Burmese invading routes into Siam.

Culture and literature

It was said that during Rama II's reign, if one could write a refined piece of poetry, then one would be able to become a royal favorite, as Loetlanaphalai himself was a poet. The reign was a cultural renaissance after the massive wars that plagued the First Reign; particularly in the fields of arts and literature. Poets employed by Rama II included Sunthorn Phu the drunken writer (Phra Aphai Mani) and Narin Dhibet (Nirat Narin). His sons, Jessadabodindra and Paramanuchitchinorot, were encouraged to excel in poetry. Poramanuchit later became a Sangharaj (Buddhist hierophant) and was well known for his religious works.

Rama II's reign saw the reconstruction of Thai culture and royal traditions. In 1811, the grand royal funeral was held for King Rama I. In the same year, a cholera epidemic broke out in Bangkok. Loetlanaphalai ordered Apat Pinat or sickness-repelling ceremonies to be performed. He also established the education and the examination system of Buddhism by dividing it into nine levels. In 1817, the Vesak festival was restored.

Foreign relations

In 1810, the first Rattanakosin-to-China mission was sent to the Jiaqing Emperor.

Since the Siamese revolution of 1688, Western presence had been reduced to a small scale as the Thai Kings ceased to encourage foreign influence. This, coupled with the Napoleonic Wars, meant there was little contact between Thailand and foreigners.

However, the wars caused many subsequent changes, which were observed in Southeast Asia. The British interest in Malaya increased as their trade with China increased. The Sultan of Kedah, a Siamese vassal, gave Penang off to the British without consulting Siam in 1786, followed by the British acquisition of Seberang Perai. Soon the British replaced the Dutch as the dominating naval power south of Siam.

The mission of the Portuguese governor of Macau in 1818 was the first formal Western contact in Siam since the Ayutthaya times. The British founded Singapore in 1819 and Jaslis, a missionary from Yangon, introduced the printing press in the same year. The Portuguese established the first western consulate in 1820. The first renewed formal British visit was made by John Crawfurd in 1822.

Death and succession
In July 1824, he died  "very suddenly". It was said to be caused by strangury, but rumours were not without strong suspicions of his being poisoned. According to the succession rule then theoretically in force, the throne would go to the son of Queen Sri Suriyendra, Prince Mongkut; however, his elder half-brother Jessadabodindra succeeded the same day. Though only the son of a concubine, he had served their father in putting down a revolt and then as Kromma Tha (Ministry of Trade and Foreign Relations.) The elder brother's experience counted for more than the theoretical claim of the much younger and inexperienced brother, who nevertheless did succeed his elder brother much later, and sired many sons but raised none of their mothers to the rank of queen, thus technically none of his sons had claim to the throne over their half-uncle whose mother was a Rama II's principal consort.

Ancestry

References

See also

 List of people with the most children

Monarchs of Thailand
Thai people of Mon descent
Rattanakosin Kingdom
18th-century Chakri dynasty
19th-century Chakri dynasty
19th-century Thai monarchs
1767 births
1824 deaths
Front Palaces
Thai poets
Thai-language poets
People from Samut Songkhram province
1800s in Siam
1810s in Siam
1820s in Siam
19th-century monarchs in Asia
Thai male Chao Fa
18th-century Thai people
19th-century Thai people